North Main Street Historic District is a national historic district located at Graham, Alamance County, North Carolina. It encompasses 101 contributing buildings date from the 1850s to 1949 in a predominantly residential section of Graham.  The district contains single and multi-family dwellings, two schools, one commercial building and three churches.

It was added to the National Register of Historic Places in 1999.

References

Historic districts on the National Register of Historic Places in North Carolina
Historic districts in Alamance County, North Carolina
National Register of Historic Places in Alamance County, North Carolina